Gore End is a village and civil parish in the Test Valley district of Hampshire, England. It is in the civil parish of East Woodhay.  The village is situated in the North Wessex Downs Area of Outstanding Natural Beauty on the Hampshire-Berkshire border. Its nearest town is Newbury, which lies approximately 4.2 miles (6.8 km) north-east from the village.

Villages in Hampshire
Test Valley